The Durham Coalfield is a coalfield in north-east England. It is continuous with the Northumberland Coalfield to its north. It extends from Bishop Auckland in the south to the boundary with the county of Northumberland along the River Tyne in the north, beyond which is the Northumberland Coalfield.

The two contiguous coalfield areas were often referred to as the Durham and Northumberland Coalfield(s) or as the Great Northern Coalfield.

Geology
 See also Geology of County Durham

The following coal seams are recorded from the Durham coalfield. They are listed here in stratigraphic order with the youngest at the top and the oldest/deepest at the bottom:

Upper Coal Measures
 Hylton Castle

Middle Coal Measures
 Dean
 Hebburn Fell
 Usworth
 Ryhope Five-Quarter
 Ryhope Little
 High Main
 Metal
 Five-Quarter
 Main
 Maudlin
 Durham Low Main
 Brass Thill
 Hutton

Lower Coal Measures
 Harvey
 Tilley
 Busty
 Three-Quarter
 Brockwell
 Victoria
 Marshall Green
 Ganister Clay

Future developments
With the development of modern technology to produce energy and capture carbon dioxide by carbon capture and storage (CCS) there is renewed interest in the exploitation of the Durham Coalfield reserves by underground coal gasification. This is of strategic importance to local energy intensive industry such as the commodity chemical and steel members of the Northeast of England Process Industry Cluster (NEPIC).

References

Coal mining regions in England
Geography of County Durham
Mining in County Durham